Stewart Hendler (born December 22, 1978) is an American film, commercial and digital series director.

He is best known for his work in digital series, where he directed the Halo 4: Forward Unto Dawn in conjunction with the promotion of the video game Halo 4, and H+: The Digital Series, a digital series created by John Cabrera and Cosimo De Tomasso.

Hendler also directed the 2009 slasher film Sorority Row, and the 2007 supernatural horror film Whisper and the 2016 superhero film Max Steel based on the Mattel action figure. 

Between longform project, Hendler has carved out a notable career directing high end automotive TV campaigns.

Hendler was born in southern California and is a 2001 graduate of the University of Southern California School of Cinema Television.

Filmography

Film

Television

References

External links 

Living people
American film directors
1978 births
Advertising directors
LGBT film directors
American music video directors
Streamy Award winners
USC School of Cinematic Arts alumni
Horror film directors